Newsham with Breckenbrough is a civil parish in the Hambleton district of North Yorkshire, England and lies on the A167. The population of the parish at the 2011 census was 128.

The parish has two Grade II* listed buildings – the West Lodge to Thornton Stud and its gateway.

Anne of Denmark with Prince Henry and Princess Elizabeth stayed at Breckenbrough Castle on 10 June 1603 as guests of Thomas Lascelles while on their way to London. The castle has been demolished and only earthworks remain. In 1618 there were two brick towers with a hall between, with two wings from the towers forming a courtyard.

Governance
The village shares a parish council with the neighbouring parish of Kirby Wiske.

References

Civil parishes in North Yorkshire
Hambleton District